Love and Other Dilemmas is a 2006 comedy film directed by Larry Di Stefano. It premiered at the 2006 Vancouver International Film Festival and was released theatrically in Canada in February 2008 by Maple Pictures. The film's credibility is notably attributed to having three regular Corner Gas actors, Gabrielle Miller, Fred Ewanuick, and Janet Wright.

Plot
It's Ginger Shapiro's wedding day. It's going to be perfect even though she's eight months pregnant, been robbed, kidnapped and thinks her fiancé Henry is dead—he's not—and then there's her grandmother's curse! It's a race to the altar in this escalating comedy of errors where Ginger and Henry might just stand a chance of living happily ever after.

Cast
 Gabrielle Miller as Ginger Shapiro
 John Cassini as Bart Ladro
 Stephen Lobo as Henry Diamond
 Fred Ewanuick as Emmett Matzdorff
 Janet Wright as Jojo Ladro
 Mark Acheson as Rocco
 Erin Karpluk as Lucy Ladro
 Alistair Abell as Frank Matzdorff
 Michael Puttonen as Big Pigeon 
 C. Ernst Harth as Little Pigeon

External links
 

2006 films
Canadian comedy films
2006 comedy films
English-language Canadian films
2000s English-language films
2000s Canadian films